Yellow foxtail is a common name for several plants and may refer to:

Pennisetum glaucum (formerly Setaria glauca)
Setaria pumila, native to Europe